David Ouellet (9 January 1908 – 14 September 1972) was a Social Credit party member of the House of Commons of Canada. Born at Saint-Ulric, Quebec, he was an insurance broker by career.

He was first elected at the Drummond—Arthabaska riding in the 1962 general election. After serving his only federal term, the 25th Canadian Parliament, Ouellet was defeated in the 1963 federal election by Jean-Luc Pépin of the Liberal party.

External links
 

1908 births
1972 deaths
People from Bas-Saint-Laurent
Members of the House of Commons of Canada from Quebec
Social Credit Party of Canada MPs